Titanoceros is a genus of snout moths. It was described by Edward Meyrick in 1884.

Species
 Titanoceros cataxantha Meyrick, 1884
 Titanoceros heliodryas Meyrick, 1933
 Titanoceros malefica (Meyrick, 1934)
 Titanoceros mirandalis (Caradja, 1925)
 Titanoceros thermoptera (Lower, 1903)
 Titanoceros vinotinctalis (Caradja, 1927)
 Titanoceros viridibasalis (Caradja, 1932)

References

Epipaschiinae
Pyralidae genera